Here to Save You All is the debut album by rapper Chino XL released on April 9, 1996.

Background
It is predominantly produced by B Wiz and only held two guest appearances from Ras Kass and Kool Keith. It was produced mostly by Chino's close associates, and the lyrical content revolved around dark, hardcore themes (mostly metaphorical braggadoccio), dismissing the commercialized hip hop that was starting to gain momentum at this time. It contains the infamous but well-known song "Riiiot!" which had a line that possibly alluded to the rumor of West Coast rapper Tupac being raped in prison. Tupac later called him out on "Hit Em Up," and Chino responded with a freestyle diss. Chino himself stated that the line was not meant as a diss, and he and Tupac were on good terms at the time of his death.

Track listing

Samples
"Here to Save You All"
"A Song of Innocence" by David Axelrod
"The Sorcerer of Isis" by Power of Zeus
"No Complex"
"I'm Still Standing" by Elton John
"Partner To Swing" 
"Five/Four" by Gene Harris
"To da Break of Dawn" by LL Cool J
"It's All Bad"
"Come Dancing" by Jeff Beck
"After the Dance (Instrumental)" by Marvin Gaye
"Freestyle Rhymes"
"Peer Pressure" by Mobb Deep
"Riiiot!" 
"Come out of the Rain" by Parliament
"Lonely Fire" by Miles Davis
"Last Dayz" by Onyx
"Don't U Know by Ol' Dirty Bastard
"Thousands" 
"Summer's Gone" by Mike Longo
"The Shit Is Real (DJ Premier Remix)" by Fat Joe
"Kreep"
"Levitate" by Becker Brothers
"Repent Walpurgis" by Procol Harum 
"Creep" by Radiohead
"Many Different Ways"
"Time's Up" by O.C.
"Phony as Ya Wanna Be" by GZA/Genius
"Ghetto Vampire"
"The Sick Rose" by David Axelrod
"Nimrodel / The Procession / The White Rider" by Camel
"Feelin' Evil Again"
"Can I Kick It?" by A Tribe Called Quest
"Rise"
"Been Such a Long Time Gone" by Hugh Masekela
"CB#5" by Ralph Vargas and Carlos Bess

Additional personnel
Kool Keith (Performer)
Gravitation (Performer)
Ras Kass (Performer)
Dan Charnas (Executive Producer)
Stephen Stickler (Photography)

References 

1996 debut albums
Chino XL albums
American Recordings (record label) albums